Lithocarpus perakensis, synonyms including Lithocarpus kingii, is a species of plant in the family Fagaceae. It is a tree endemic to Peninsular Malaysia. It is threatened by habitat loss.

References

perakensis
Endemic flora of Peninsular Malaysia
Trees of Peninsular Malaysia
Vulnerable flora of Asia
Taxonomy articles created by Polbot